This is a list of television broadcasters which provide coverage of the UEFA Champions League, European football's top level continental competition, as well as the UEFA Super Cup. Starting from the 2021–22 season, during the group stage, two matches will kick off at 18:45 CET (instead of 18:55 previously) and the rest of the matches, including the high-profile group stage matches and those from Faroe Islands, Iceland, Ireland, Portugal and the United Kingdom, knockout stage and the final will continue kick-off at 21:00 CET.

UEFA sells the broadcast rights in a three-season basis and various packages are available for bidders, with UEFA weighing balance between free and pay television under the UEFA and European Union (EU) agreement. While balancing between free and pay television, if the rights do not sell within "sales windows", the rights may be sold on an individual basis to pay-per-view television broadcasters.

The 2009 final attracted an audience of 109 million people around the world, a record number for the competition, and replaced the Super Bowl as the most-watched annual sports event.

Broadcasters

2021–2024 seasons

Notes

2024–2027 seasons

Notes

References

UEFA Champions League
Lists of association football broadcasters